Gu Biwei (born 17 February 1988) is a Chinese female high jumper, who won an individual gold medal at the Youth World Championships.

References

External links

1988 births
Living people
Chinese female high jumpers